Limuru is a town in central Kenya. It is also the name of a parliamentary constituency and an administrative division. The population of the town, as of 2004, was about 4,800. In a census taken in 2019 the population had increased to 159,314.

Location
The geographical coordinates of Limuru town are:1°06'28.0"S, 36°38'34.0"E (Latitude:-1.107778; Longitude:36.642778).

Education

The town has the advantage of having some of the best high schools in Kenya. Key among them include; Loreto Girls High School, Limuru and Limuru Girls High School. The notable  Alliance High School is located 15 kilometers outside the town.

St Paul's University Limuru is the main institution of high learning located in the outskirts of the town. Several smaller training institutions can also be found within the town precincts.

History 
The native language of most people in Limuru is Kikuyu, with Swahili and English being widely spoken.

Limuru served as the capital of Kiambu West District which was formerly part of Kiambu District. It is now a sub county in the main Kiambu County. In addition, it is also the name of a parliament constituency.

Most of the area of Limuru is now what was previously known as the "white highlands", a rich agricultural land south of the equator. The term "white highlands" derived from the British and other Europeans who realised the productive potential of this area and settled in large numbers with the support of the colonial government, establishing coffee and tea plantations, cereal farms and ranches. The altitude of the town is about 2,500 meters. Limuru has a temperature of 10–28 °C (75 °F) year round.

There is a railway station at Limuru town.

Industry 
Limuru is widely known in Kenya as a tea-producing and processing area. The main factories are Karirana Tea Estates and Mabroukie Teas Estates on the outskirts of the town.

The tea plantations established around Limuru from 1903 onwards were the foundation of Kenya's tea industry. Limuru is home to the BATA shoe company, the largest shoe factory in East and Central Africa. In recent years, more companies have established themselves in the town, including Procter and Allan, polypipes and Fruit 'n' Juice.

Also in Limuru is the Nest Children's Home, which specializes in the care of children of imprisoned mothers.

The town of Limuru grew with the railway, the tea industry (especially with major expansion from the 1920s), and the Bata shoe factory and head office.

The town also serves as a milk processing zone obtained from the small-scale dairy farming in the surrounding area.

People
Limuru residents rely mostly on farming and a shoe factory for employment. Early in the British colonial period (from the 1890s) Europeans settled in the area due to its proximity to Nairobi, the railway, its fertile land and pleasant weather. It is the birthplace of the African writer, Ngũgĩ wa Thiong'o, as well as that of Bishop Caesar Gatimu and human rights and political activist Percy Faith Fawaki (Zartaj).

Dipsy kush a poet was born in limuru.

Health care
Limuru town is served by one government run health facility, Limuru Health Center which is located within the town limits. Other health facilities in Limuru include Rwamburi Dispensary, Rironi Dispensary, Thigio Dispensary, Ndeiya Health Center and Ngecha Health Center. Tigoni District Hospital is the main government hospital and serves as the link facility between the rural health facilities and the main National referral hospital.
Health care has seen an improvement in quality of services with the collaboration of other stakeholders. Services such as cervical cancer screening by VIA/VILLI is available at all government run facilities in Limuru. The nurses working in these clinics also conduct outreach programs to ensure more women are screened. Uptake of long-term contraceptive methods such as implants and IUCDs has also improved due to intensive community education and outreach programs undertaken by the staff working in the various government health facilities. It is for this reason that Ndeiya Health Center was confirmed the  center of excellence in addressing family planning and cervical cancer screening in East and Central Africa. Ndeiya Health Center has  mentored other health facilities in the area including Rwamburi Dispensary with an aim of replicating the success in the same. Constituency development fund has funded the construction of three rural facilities in the area. These are: Rwamburi Dispensary, Rironi Dispensary and Ngecha Health Center. Also, there are several private hospitals in Limuru.

Community strategy has been implemented in the area and community units such as Ndiuni community unit has been conducting various community health activities. These community units are linked to their respective health facilities where they refer patients.

Recent developments
Due to its proximity to Nairobi and its location on the main highway linking Nairobi to other towns like Naivasha, Eldoret and Kisumu, Limuru is attracting investors and businesses. In July 2014, developers of a new  shopping mall broke ground. This will be the first mall in the town. Tuskys, the number two supermarket chain in Kenya by sales, will be the anchor tenant, taking up about 50% of the rental space. The development is expected to cost KSh650 million (approx. US$7.5 million) to construct, and is expected to be ready during the second half of 2018. The number three supermarket chain in the country, naivas together with Society Stores have opened new stores in Limuru during the year 2016 & 2017 respectively. The new supermarkets will join others such as Cleanshelf, the then major supermarket in the town, as at January 2015. The Great Kenyan Bake Off, the Kenyan version of The Great British Bake Off, was filmed at Limuru.

References

External links

Investors Flocking Limuru Town, Says MP

Kiambu County
Populated places in Central Province (Kenya)